The 1996 Big West Conference men's basketball tournament was held March 8–March 10 at Lawlor Events Center in Reno, Nevada.

San José State defeated Utah State in the championship game in overtime, 76–75, to obtain the second Big West Conference men's basketball tournament championship in school history.

Thus, the Spartans were invited and participated in the 1996 NCAA Division I men's basketball tournament, making it the third time SJSU has appeared in the NCAA Division I men's basketball tournament. San José State was the only school in the Big West to appear in the NCAA Tournament.

Format

For this season, no teams have disbanded nor joined the Big West Conference. However, the conference decided that six teams with the best conference records would play. As a result, Cal State Fullerton, New Mexico State, UC Santa Barbara, and UNLV did not participate.

Since six teams participated, the top two seeds, Long Beach State as No. 1 and UC Irvine as No. 2, were given Quarterfinals byes. The four other teams, Nevada, Pacific, San Jose State, and Utah State, competed in the quarterfinals.

Bracket

References

Big West Conference men's basketball tournament
Tournament
Big West Conference men's basketball tournament
Big West Conference men's basketball tournament